Appeal to Reason may refer to :

 Appeal to Reason (newspaper), US newspaper, published from 1895 until 1922
 Appeal to Reason (album), 2008 album by Rise Against